There Is a Hell... Tour was a concert tour by British rock band Bring Me the Horizon, taking place during 2010–2011, in support of their third studio album There Is a Hell Believe Me I've Seen It. There Is a Heaven Let's Keep It a Secret.

The tour began with the band playing as part of the Vans Warped Tour throughout June–August 2010, just a few days after finishing recording the album. In the middle of the tour, the band skipped out a few Warped Tour dates in order to participate in the Sonisphere Festival in Knebworth, England on 1 August 2010.

Following Warped Tour, the band supported Bullet for My Valentine on their tour of Asia and Oceania in early September, and late September saw the band headlining their own tour of the UK with supporting acts Cancer Bats and Tek-One. Throughout October–November 2010, the band co-headlining the Alternative Press Tour with August Burns Red and supporting acts Emarosa, Polar Bear Club and This Is Hell in the US, and in December the band supported once again Bullet for My Valentine in a series of special 5 UK arena shows.

January 2011 saw the band headlining the first European leg of the tour with supporting acts The Devil Wears Prada and Architects, which was followed by dates in Indonesia, Japan and Australia, playing as part of the Soundwave Festival dates.

In March–April 2011, the band supported A Day to Remember on a US tour with other supporting acts Pierce the Veil and We Came as Romans, which was followed by another UK tour and a summer European tour of mostly festival appearances in such festivals as Rock am Ring, Nova Rock, Metaltown, Pukkelpop, Graspop and more.

The band headlined a US tour in September 2011, with support from Parkway Drive, Architects, Deez Nuts and While She Sleeps, and a South American tour in October 2011, and supporting Machine Head as a special guest on their European winter tour in November–December 2011, along with DevilDriver and Darkest Hour, which was the band's final leg before concluding the tour and going back home to work on their follow-up album.

Set list

Tour dates

Support acts

 A Night in Hollywood (21 June 2010)
 Architects (14 January–6 February 2011; 22 April–4 May 2011; 6, 11, 14, 15, 20–23, 28–29 June 2011; 31 August–6 October 2011)
 Asking Alexandria (1–2 March 2011)
 Atreyu (6–12 December 2010)
 Cancer Bats (1–7, 9–11, 21–30 September 2010)
 Carnifex (6 October 2011)
 Deez Nuts (19–23 February 2011; 14, 15, 20–22, 29 June 2011; 31 August–4 October 2011)
 Emarosa (13 October–28 November 2010)
 Enter Shikari (23 June 2010)
 Here Comes the Kraken (30 November 2010)
 Momma Knows Best (16 June 2011)
 Morda (11 June 2011)
 Of Legends (31 August–17 September 2011)
 On Broken Wings (19 September–4 October 2011)

 Parkway Drive (22 April–3 May 2011; 6 September–4 October 2011)
 Pierce the Veil (10 March–18 April 2011)
 Polar Bear Club (13 October–28 November 2010)
 Silverstein (6 June 2011)
 Snite.No (30 November 2010)
 Suicide Silence (31 August–5 September 2011)
 Tek-One (21 September–1 October 2010; 14 January–16 February 2011)
 The Amity Affliction (1–2 March 2011)
 The Blackstone Chronicles (16 June 2011)
 The Devil Wears Prada (14 January–6 February 2011; 22 April–4 May 2011)
 This Is Hell (13 October–28 November 2010)
 TRC (27 September 2010)
 We Came as Romans (10 March–18 April 2011)
 While She Sleeps (4 May 2011; 28–29 June 2011; 24–25 August 2011)
 You Me at Six (21–23 June 2010)
 Your Demise (21–23 June 2010)

As a supporting act
 A Day to Remember (10 March–18 April 2011)
 August Burns Red (13 October–2, 4–28 November 2010) (Co-Headliner)
 Bullet for My Valentine (1–7, 9–11 September 2010; 6–12 December 2010)
 Machine Head (1 November–6 December 2011)

Songs played
From Count Your Blessings
"Pray for Plagues"
"For Stevie Wonder's Eyes Only (Braille)"
"Off the Heezay"

From Suicide Season
"The Comedown"
"Chelsea Smile"
"Football Season Is Over"
"Sleep with One Eye Open"
"Diamonds Aren't Forever"
"The Sadness Will Never End"
"No Need for Introductions, I've Read About Girls Like You on the Backs of Toilet Doors"
"Suicide Season"

From There Is a Hell Believe Me I've Seen It. There Is a Heaven Let's Keep It a Secret.
"Crucify Me"
"Anthem"
"It Never Ends"
"Fuck"
"Home Sweet Hole"
"Alligator Blood"
"Memorial"
"Blessed with a Curse"
"Visions"

References

Bring Me the Horizon
2010 concert tours
2011 concert tours